Tongzhou District (alternate spellings Tungchow Tungchou (T'ung-chou), or Tong County during 1914–1997) is a district of Beijing. It is located in southeast Beijing and considered the eastern gateway to the nation's capital. It had a population of 673,952 at the 2000 Census, and has seen significant growth and development since then, growing to a population of 1,184,000 at the 2010 Census. The district is subdivided into four subdistricts, ten towns, and one ethnic township.

History

Tongzhou was founded in 195 BC during the Western Han Dynasty under the name of Lu (路) County, although there is evidence for human settlement in the Neolithic. At the start of the Eastern Han Dynasty the character Lu by which it was known was altered by the addition of a water radical to become Lu (潞). In 1151 under the Jin dynasty Lu County was renamed Tongzhou, roughly meaning 'the place for passing through', in recognition of its importance as the land and water approach to Beijing.

Ming, Qing & Republican era
In July 1937, subsequent to the infamous Marco Polo Bridge Incident, Tongzhou became another site of determined Chinese resistance. In the Tongzhou Mutiny troops of the nominally Japanese-puppet East Hopei Army rebelled and came to the aid of hard-pressed Kuomintang troops, and attacked the Japanese garrison. In the fall of Tongzhou to the Nationalists, many civilians were murdered and abused as well as captured Japanese military personnel.

People's Republic
The place name changed to Tong County when the area was placed under the new municipal region of Beijing in 1914. It again reverted to "Tongzhou" when the area was upgraded in 1997 to a district.

On 11 July 2015, Tongzhou became the second administrative seat of Beijing as a "sub-administrative center" for the municipality. Numerous local government departments will be moved to Tongzhou to reduce crowding within the city center of Beijing.

Economy
In 2017, the regional GDP of the district was 75.8 billion yuan, with GDP per capita at 50.3 thousand yuan.

Geography and environment

Tongzhou District borders the Beijing districts of Shunyi, Chaoyang and Daxing, Wuqing District of Tianjin Municipality, and Langfang City (both the Sanhe City−Dachang County−Xianghe County exclave and Guangyang District) of Hebei province, and is 12 miles from Tiananmen Square and 10 miles from Beijing Capital International Airport.

Its climate belongs to the mild temperate zone, with distinct seasons including hot summers and freezing winters. Dust storms are common. Several large rivers, among them the Wenyu, the Liangshui and Chaobai flow through the district.

Climate 

Tongzhou District has a humid continental climate (Köppen climate classification Dwa).

Administrative divisions

Tongzhou District is divided into six subdistricts, ten towns, and one ethnic township. Two of the towns of which carry the "area" label.

On May 11, 2020, Tongzhou District Government made a series of changes to its administrative divisions by adding the following subdistricts:

 Wenjing Subdistrict (文景街道)
 Jiukeshu Subdistrict (九棵树街道)
 Linheli Subdistrict (临河里街道)
 Yangzhuang Subdistrict (杨庄街道)
 Luyi Subdistrict (潞邑街道)

Transportation

Downtown Tongzhou is connected to downtown Beijing by Jingtong Expressway and several metro lines operated by Beijing Subway. Beijing's Fifth and Sixth Ring Road are roughly equidistant from Tongzhou's CBD. Highways lead to Shenyang, Harbin and Tianjin/Tanggu.

Metro
Tongzhou is currently served by four metro lines operated by Beijing Subway:

  – Wuzixueyuanlu, Tongzhou Beiguan, Beiyunhe West, Beiyunhe East, Haojiafu, Dongxiayuan, Lucheng
  – Wansheng Xi (West), Wansheng Dong (East), Qun Fang, Gao Lou Jin, Hua Zhuang, 
  – Tongzhou Beiyuan, Hua Zhuang, 
  – Tongjinanlu, Jinghailu, Ciqu South, Ciqu,

Suburban railway
Tongzhou is also served by two suburban railway lines:
  – Tongzhou, Qiaozhuang East
  – Tongzhou West

Industry and tourism
Downtown Tongzhou is earmarked for redevelopment into a comprehensive central business district with an emphasis on consumer retail. In agriculture, the district emphasizes on horticulture, fruit-farming, seed-growing and aquatics. The district government is currently promoting Tongzhou's position at the head of the Grand Canal to attract tourists to its Grand Canal Cultural Park. 

The Songzhuang artists' village, where many Chinese contemporary artists live and work, is located in the Tongzhou District.

The Universal Beijing Resort is also located in Tongzhou, and opened on 20 September 2021.

Canal Business District is under construction. Headquarters of Beijing branches of Central Government-owned Enterprises and Headquarters of Beijing Government-owned Enterprises will move to Tongzhou. Canal Business District plans to develop industrial clusters of headquarters economy and wealth management.

Gallery of the construction site of Canal Business District:

Education and health

Tongzhou has good education facilities including 113 kindergartens, 141 primary schools, 51 high schools and many adult education colleges. It also boasts the Beijing Materials Institute, Beijing University of Technology and the Beijing Institute of Music. Its hospitals include a specialist tuberculosis treatment center and a hospital specializing in traditional Chinese medicine.

Private schools include:
 Beijing Shuren Ribet Private School

See also 
 List of administrative divisions of Beijing

References

External links

 Official website of the Tongzhou District People's Government 
 Tongzhou website of the Tongzhou Government

 
Districts of Beijing
195 BC
190s BC establishments
States and territories established in the 2nd century BC
2nd-century BC establishments in China